Kar nepalensis is a species of beetle in the family Carabidae, the only species in the genus Kar.

References

Platyninae